Wang Newton (born Mei-yin) is a professional drag king and Asian LGBT figure whilst running "Wang TV" on YouTube. They were featured in a 2021 New York Times article by Frank DeCaro profiling notable American drag kings. Performing since 2004, "Dr. Wang" is one of the few full-time drag king performers with an international profile.

Early life 
Wang was born in Taiwan but grew up in midwest America, mostly in central Pennsylvania. Inspired by RuPaul's Drag Race, Wang started to explore her masculinity before starting to perform as a drag king at friend's parties making a debut on Halloween night in Philadelphia.

Career  
Wang does shows internationally most notably in Taiwan, Berlin, Los Angeles and New York City. Starting in 2020, Wang Newton co-produced an online monthly performance series called Sacred Wounds featuring Asian drag artists. In December 2020, Wang Newton participated in an advocacy campaign called #DragForAllFlavors that was organized by PepsiCo sparkling water brand bubly and the LGBTQ+ elder services organization SAGE.

Wang is represented by the leading Diversity and LGBTQ+ talent agency, LTA INC (Luxe Talent Agency, Inc).

References

External links 

Taiwanese stage actors
American people of Taiwanese descent
Taiwanese LGBT entertainers
Living people
American drag kings
Year of birth unknown
Year of birth missing (living people)

 Chang, Joy YT. "Wang Newton: a drag king in a world of queens." Video interview. South China Morning Post. 25 November 2019.